Emil Skrynkowicz (3 May 1907 – 26 October 1931) was a Polish footballer. He played in one match for the Poland national football team in 1931.

References

External links
 

1907 births
1931 deaths
Polish footballers
Poland international footballers
Place of birth missing
Association footballers not categorized by position